SLIC may refer to:

 Software licensing description table, in a computer BIOS
 Sri Lanka Insurance Corporation, an insurance provider
 State Life Insurance Corporation of Pakistan
 Subaxial Injury Classification, a severity score for cervical spine trauma
 Subscriber line interface card, an electronic circuit